Kohoutek is a Czech surname.  Kohoutek may refer to:

 Ctirad Kohoutek (1929–2011), Czech composer and music theorist
 Luboš Kohoutek (born 1935), Czech astronomer
 "Kohoutek," a song by Journey from the album Journey
 "Kohoutek", a song by R.E.M. from the album Fables of the Reconstruction

See also
 Comet Kohoutek, a comet discovered by and named in honor of the astronomer
 1850 Kohoutek, an asteroid also named in honor of the astronomer
 Kohout
 Kohut

Czech-language surnames